Faruk Hadžibegić (born 7 October 1957) is a Bosnian professional football manager and former player who is the manager of the Bosnia and Herzegovina national team.

Club career
During his career, Hadžibegić played for hometown club Sarajevo, Real Betis, Sochaux and Toulouse. He was an important member of the memorable Sarajevo squad that won the 1984–85 Yugoslav First League. At Sochaux he played for years alongside compatriot Mehmed Baždarević.

International career
Hadžibegić is the second most-capped Bosnian player and fifth overall most-capped player for the Yugoslav national team (61 caps) - first being Zlatko Vujović, who is second overall (70 caps). He made his debut for them in an October 1982 European Championship qualification match away against Norway.

Hadžibegić was a participant in the 1990 FIFA World Cup in Italy for Yugoslavia, appearing in all five of his team's matches. Yugoslavia went on to face Argentina in the quarter-finals, where after a 0–0 draw in regulation and extra time, elimination was decided on a penalty shoot-out. Dragan Stojković, Dragoljub Brnović and Hadžibegić missed an opportunity to score from a penalty, as Stojković missed the first completely, while Sergio Goycochea stopped the fourth by Brnović and final attempt by Hadžibegić, thus sending the Yugoslav team home. 

Hadžibegić featured regularly and played his last match for Yugoslavia in March 1992, a friendly game against the Netherlands.

Managerial career
Hadžibegić began his managerial career with his former club Sochaux with whom he gained promotion to Ligue 1 in 1997. He was then manager of the Bosnia and Herzegovina national team. In 2000, Hadžibegić took over Real Betis, with whom he gained promotion to La Liga in 2001. He came back to France with Troyes, before stints in Turkey with Gaziantepspor, Diyarbakırspor and Denizlispor.

Hadžibegić then joined Chamois Niortais. He was named manager of Dijon in December 2007, and was released in June 2009. On 9 December 2009, after sacking coach Philippe Anziani, Bastia named Hadžibegić as the club's new manager. He left the club in 2010. From 2010 to 2011, he managed Arles-Avignon and later Valenciennes, from 2016 until 2017.

In October 2018, Hadžibegić replaced Régis Brouard as Red Star manager in Ligue 2. On 25 March 2019, after a series of poor results, he left Red Star.

On 25 July 2019, it was announced that Hadžibegić became the new manager of the Montenegro national team. The next day, on 26 July, at a press conference, it was revealed that he signed a one and a half year contract with the team, keeping him manager at least until the end of 2020. He was sacked by the Montenegrin FA on 28 December 2020. On 16 July 2022, Hadžibegić became the new manager of Algerian side MC Alger. On 10 September 2022, he left MC Alger after three games as manager.

In January 2023, Hadžibegić returned to managing the Bosnia and Herzegovina national team, replacing the outgoing Ivaylo Petev. He was tasked with qualifying the team for UEFA Euro 2024.

Administrative career
From 25 December 2002 until 18 February 2004, Hadžibegić held the role of the 29th President of the Assembly of FK Sarajevo.

Career statistics
Scores and results list Yugoslavia's goal tally first, score column indicates score after each Hadžibegić goal.

Managerial statistics

Honours

Player
Sarajevo 
Yugoslav First League: 1984–85

Sochaux 
French Division 2: 1987–88 (Group A)

Bibliography

References

External links

1957 births
Living people
Footballers from Sarajevo
Yugoslav footballers
Bosnia and Herzegovina footballers
Association football defenders
FK Sarajevo players
Real Betis players
FC Sochaux-Montbéliard players
Toulouse FC players
Yugoslav First League players
La Liga players
Ligue 1 players
Ligue 2 players
Yugoslavia international footballers
UEFA Euro 1984 players
1990 FIFA World Cup players
Yugoslav expatriate footballers
Bosnia and Herzegovina expatriate footballers
Yugoslav expatriate sportspeople in Spain
Yugoslav expatriate sportspeople in France
Expatriate footballers in Spain
Expatriate footballers in France
Bosniaks of Bosnia and Herzegovina
Bosnia and Herzegovina football managers
FC Sochaux-Montbéliard managers
Bosnia and Herzegovina national football team managers
Real Betis managers
ES Troyes AC managers
Gaziantepspor managers
Diyarbakırspor managers
Denizlispor managers
Chamois Niortais F.C. managers
Dijon FCO managers
SC Bastia managers
AC Arlésien managers
Valenciennes FC managers
Red Star F.C. managers
Montenegro national football team managers
MC Alger managers
Ligue 2 managers
La Liga managers
Segunda División managers
Ligue 1 managers
Süper Lig managers
Algerian Ligue Professionnelle 1 managers
Bosnia and Herzegovina expatriate football managers
Bosnia and Herzegovina expatriate sportspeople in France
Bosnia and Herzegovina expatriate sportspeople in Spain
Bosnia and Herzegovina expatriate sportspeople in Turkey
Bosnia and Herzegovina expatriate sportspeople in Montenegro
Expatriate football managers in France
Expatriate football managers in Spain
Expatriate football managers in Turkey
Expatriate football managers in Montenegro
Expatriate football managers in Algeria
FK Sarajevo presidents of the assembly